Alfred Robert Waylen (1833 – 10 January 1901) was a colonial surgeon in Western Australia and a winemaker.

Waylen was born at Point Walter, Western Australia, son of Alfred Waylen and his wife, née Bailey. A. R. Waylen qualified as M.R.C.S. Eng., L.S.A. (London), and L.Mid.R.C.S. Eng. in 1856. He entered the colonial service in April 1859 as medical officer Swan District, and was for sixteen years in the Imperial medical service in charge of the Guildford convict depot and out-stations. He was appointed colonial surgeon in August 1873, medical officer of Perth prison in 1876, and was also president of the Medical Board and of the Central Board of Health. Dr. Waylen, who was an M.D. of Melbourne and a J. P. of Western Australia, and was a member of the Perth Commission for the Colonial and Indian Exhibition, visited England in 1890. He married in 1887 Louisa, daughter of the Rev. Thomas Henry Walpole, vicar of Winslow, Bucks, and widow of Sir Luke S. Leake. Dr. Waylen was one of the pioneers of the wine industry in Western Australia, starting a winery in Darlington.

Waylen died childless in Guildford, Western Australia on 10 January 1901.

References

1833 births
1901 deaths
Australian surgeons
Australian winemakers
People from Perth, Western Australia